Isfiya, also known as Ussefiya or Usifiyeh, is a Druze-majority village in northern Israel, governed by a local council. It also includes Christians, Muslims and a few Jewish households. Located on Mount Carmel, it is part of the Haifa District. In  its population was 	12,136. In 2003, the local council was merged with nearby Daliyat al-Karmel to form Carmel City. However, the new city was dissolved in 2008 and the two villages resumed their independent status.

History

Late Roman and Byzantine periods
Isfiya was built on the ruins of an ancient settlement. A building, dating from the second–fourth centuries CE has been excavated, together with  ceramics and coins dating from the period.

In 1930, remains of a 5th-century Jewish town, Husifah or Huseifa, were unearthed in Isfiya. Among the finds are a synagogue with a mosaic floor bearing Jewish symbols and the inscription "Peace upon Israel". A cache of 4,500 gold coins were found dating from the Roman period.

Crusader period
Crusader remnants have been found in the village. Isfiya was mentioned as part of the domain of the Sultan during the hudna between the Crusaders based in Acre and the Mamluk sultan al-Mansur (Qalawun) declared in 1283.

Ottoman period
The Druze came to the village in the early eighteenth century. The inhabitants made their living from olive oil, honey and grapes.

Isfiya was one of only two villages remaining on Mount Carmel after the expulsion of Ibrahim Pasha in 1841. Seventeen other villages disappeared. The village's survival was attributed partly to "the exceptional valour" of the inhabitants, partly to buying protection from a local Galilee chief, Aqil Agha. 

In 1859, the English consul Rogers estimated the population to be 400, who cultivated 20 feddans of land. In 1863, H.B. Tristram visited the village, which he described as Druze and Christian, with a Christian sheikh. Tristam noted that the women's clothing in this village were  much like those of al-Bassa, being either "plain, patched or embroidered in the most fantastic and grotesque shapes". In 1870, the French explorer Victor Guérin found that the village had six hundred inhabitants, almost all Druze, with the exception of sixty, who belonged to the "Schismatic Greeks". Gardens were grown all around the village. Some houses seemed very old and dated, Guérin surmised, from the Middle Ages or even earlier, from the time of the Crusades. 

In 1881 the Palestine Exploration Fund's Survey of Western Palestine described it as standing "on the highest part of the Carmel watershed, and the highest house was therefore the trigonometrical station on the ridge. It is a moderate-sized village of stone houses, with a well on the south-west. The inhabitants are all Druses. [..] Corn-land and olives surround the land." A population list from about 1887 showed that Isfiya had about 555 inhabitants; 480 Druze and 75 Catholic Christians. When a Jewish moshava was established at Mutallah (Metula) north of Safed in 1896, the Druze population resisted eviction until receiving a reasonable compensation in 1904; some relocated to Isfiya, including the Wahb family.

British Mandate

In the 1922 census of Palestine conducted by the British Mandate authorities, Isfiya had a population of 733; 590 Druze, 17 Muslims and 126  Christians; the Christians broken down by denomination were six Orthodox, six Roman Catholics, 107 Greek Catholics (Melkites), and seven Maronites. At the time of the 1931 census, Isfiya had 251 occupied houses and a population of 742 Druzes, 187 Christians, and 176 Muslims; a total of 1,105. These counts included the smaller localities Damun Farm, Shallala Farm and al-Jalama.

In the 1945 statistics the population of Isfiya consisted of 1,790; 180 Muslims, 300 Christians and 1,310 classified as "others", that is, Druze, while the land area was 46,905 dunams, according to an official land and population survey. Of this, 1,103 dunams were designated for plantations and irrigable land, 17,357 for cereals, while 74 dunams were built-up (urban) areas.

During the 1936-39 Arab revolt in Palestine, the villagers initially supported a local rebel group led by Yusuf Abu Durra. However, after local leaders were abducted and murdered, the notables turned to the British, who destroyed the group. A Druze self-defense force was established that received arms from the British and sometimes coordinated its activities with local Jewish forces.

State of Israel
Though Isfiya is predominantly Druze, a number of Jews also live there and in other Druze villages due to their low rent rates.

Climate
Isfiya has a mediterranean climate (Köppen climate classification: Csa).

Demographics

77.1% of the population is Druze, 13.6% is Christian and 9.1% is Muslim. A few Jewish families also live there. The Christian population is mostly Melkite Catholic, with a few Maronite households.

Landmarks
The tomb of Abu Abdallah is located in Isfiya.  Abu Abdullah was one of three religious leaders chosen by Caliph Al-Hakem in 996 CE to proclaim the Druze faith. He is said to have been the first Druze religious judge (qadi). The Druze make an annual visit to this shrine on November 15.

Economy
Isfiya and Daliyat al-Karmel joined Yokneam Illit and the Megiddo Regional Council to develop the Mevo Carmel Jewish-Arab Industrial Park to benefit from the existing high-tech ecosystem.

The economy of Isfiya is consistently growing as more tourists are visiting regularly, and more businesses are being opened.

Notable people

 Zeidan Atashi
 Reda Mansour
 Elias Tony Absawy

See also
 Arab localities in Israel
 Druze in Israel

References

Bibliography

External links
Welcome To 'Isfiya
Survey of Western Palestine, Map 5:  IAA, Wikimedia commons 

Arab localities in Israel
Druze communities in Israel
Arab Christian communities in Israel
Local councils in Haifa District
Mount Carmel